This is a list of compositions by Silvestre Revueltas (1899–1940).

Stage works

Ballets 
La coronela, 1940 (unfinished; a completion by Blas Galindo and Candelario Huízar lost)
El renacuajo paseador, 1936

Orchestral works 
Pieza para orquesta, 1929
Esquinas, 1931 (rev. 1933)
Cuauhnáhuac, for string orchestra, 1931; revised for full orchestra, 1931; revised again for full orchestra 1932
Ventanas, 1931
Alcancías, 1932
Colorines, for chamber orchestra, 1932
El renacuajo paseador, 1933
Janitzio, 1933 (rev. 1936)
Toccata (sin fuga), for violin and chamber orchestra 1933
Troka, 1933
Caminos, 1934
La coronela (orch. by José Pablo Moncayo and arr. by José Limantour)
Danza geométrica (orchestral version of Planos), 1934
Itinerarios, 1938
Música para charlar, 1938 (from the film score of Ferrocarriles de Baja California)
Sensemayá, 1938

Chamber works 
El afilador, 1924
Batik, 1926
Four Little Pieces for two violins and cello, 1929
String Quartet No. 1, 1930
String Quartet No. 2, 1931
String Quartet No. 3, 1931
String Quartet No. 4, Música de feria, 1932
Tres pequeñas piezas serias, for quintet of mixed winds, 1932–33
Tres piezas, for violin and piano, 1932
Ocho x radio, 1933
Planos, 1934
Homenaje a Federico García Lorca, 1936
Éste era un rey 1940
First Little Serious Piece, five wind instruments (piccolo, oboe, clarinet, baritone saxophone, trumpet), 1940
Second Little Serious Piece, for five wind instruments (piccolo, oboe, clarinet, baritone saxophone, trumpet), 1940

Film scores 
Redes, 1935
¡Vámonos con Pancho Villa!, 1936
Ferrocarriles de Baja California, 1938
Selections reworked as Música para charlar
El indio, 1938
Bajo el signo de la muerte, 1939
Los de abajo, 1939
La noche de los mayas (Night of the Mayas), 1939
¡Que viene mi marido!, 1940

Songs 
"Duo para pato y canario", voice and chamber orchestra, 1931
"Ranas" (Frogs) and "El tecolote" (The Owl), voice and piano, 1931
"Caminando", 1937
"Canto a una muchacha negra" (words by Langston Hughes), voice and piano 1938
"Cinco canciones para niños y dos canciones profanas", 1938–39

Piano 
Allegro
Canción (a passage used also in Cuauhnáhuac)

References

Sources

Further reading
 Clark, Walter Aaron (1999). "The Music of Latin America". In Latin America: An Interdisciplinary Approach, third edition, edited by Julio López-Arias and Gladys Varona-Lacey, 233–253. New York: P. Lang.

External links

 
Revueltas, Silvestre